Morgenster ("Morning Star" in the Dutch language) may refer to:

 Morgenster, Aruba, a village on the island of Aruba in the Caribbean
 Morgenster (ship), a Dutch registered sail training ship
 The Morgenster mission station near the town of Masvingo, Zimbabwe
 The Morgenster residential area of Brackenfell in the Western Cape, South Africa

See also
 Morgenstern (disambiguation)
 Morning Star (disambiguation)